Trasmediterránea operates passengers and cargo ferries between mainland Spain and the Canary Islands, the Balearic Islands, and northern Africa's Spanish territories.

Since 2017 the majority of the company belongs to Naviera Armas.

History
The Trasmediterránea ("cross-mediterranean") company was constituted on November 26, 1916, with the fusion of the companies of shipowners José Juan Dómine, Vicente Ferrer, Joaquín Tintoré and Enrique García, though it didn't start operating until January 1 of following year. It was headquartered in Barcelona and had a fleet of 45 ships.

During the Spanish Civil War, its ships were used as auxiliary navy ships by both sides of the conflict, the Spanish Republican Navy and the Nationalist faction.

In 1978, it became a state-owned company, until it was privatized by the PP government in 2002. The SEPI sold the company to a consortium that consisted of Acciona Logística (60%), Caja de Ahorros del Mediterráneo, Compañía de Remolcadores Ibaizábal, Agrupación Hotelera Dóliga, Suministros Ibiza and Naviera Armas. Later, the company changed its name to Acciona-Trasmediterranea. Currently it operates a fleet of 25 ships and is headquartered in Madrid.

From 1921 to 1998, when the sector was liberalized, it had the monopoly on the lines that linked the mainland Spain with the islands and northern Africa. Today, even as it has lost its monopoly and has competition, Trasmediterránea is still leader in its sector.

At the end of October 2017, Acciona group agreed to sell its 92.7% stake in Trasmediterránea to Naviera Armas, another Spanish shipping company operating ferries mainly in the Canary Islands. The deal, pending approval by Spanish authorities, was expected to be completed in the first quarter of 2018.

Company activity

Trasmediterránea has its own maritime stations in Barcelona, Las Palmas de Gran Canaria and Valencia. The company's activity is structured in four zones:
 Canarias-Cádiz: regular lines, in both directions, from:
Cádiz to Santa Cruz de Tenerife, Las Palmas, Santa Cruz de la Palma and Arrecife.
Arrecife to Cádiz, Las Palmas de Gran Canaria and Puerto del Rosario.
Santa Cruz de la Palma to Arrecife, Cádiz, Las Palmas de Gran Canaria and Santa Cruz de Tenerife.
Santa Cruz de Tenerife to Arrecife, Cádiz, Las Palmas de Gran Canaria, Morro Jable and Santa Cruz de la Palma.
 Inter-Canarian:
Las Palmas de Gran Canaria to Arrecife, Morro Jable, Puerto del Rosario, Santa Cruz de Tenerife and Santa Cruz de la Palma.
 Mainland-Baleares: regular lines, in both directions, from:
Barcelona to Palma de Mallorca, Ibiza and Mahón.
Valencia to Palma de Mallorca, Ibiza and Mahón.
Gandía to Palma de Mallorca and Ibiza.
 South-Strait: regular lines, in both directions, from:
Algeciras to Ceuta and Tánger (Morocco)
Almería to Ghazaouet and Orán (Algeria), Melilla and Nador (Morocco).
Málaga to Melilla.
 United Kingdom: Previously operated regular lines, in both directions from:
 Bilbao to Portsmouth (service now discontinued).

Fleet

As of 2018, Trasmediterránea  owns and operates a large fleet of vessels, comprising 25 roro ferries, 1 high speed monohull and 3 high speed catamarans.

Former Fleet

Plus Ultra (1928-1977) Scrapped in Spain in 1977.
La Palma (1930-1976) As a museum ship in Tenerife, Spain since 1986.
Victoria (1952-1984) Scrapped in 1984.
Virgen De Africa (1953-1986) Scrapped in 1992.
Santa Maria De Las Nieves (1964-1982) Scrapped in 1992.
Juan March (1966-1985) As Ocean Majesty since 1995.
Santa Cruz De Tenerife (1966-1985) Scrapped in Aliaga, Turkey in 1987.
Ciudad De Compostela (1967-1992) Sank as Saray Star while was on route from Piraeus to Venice in 1994.
Las Palmas De Gran Canaria (1967-1986) Scrapped as Royal Pacific at Taiwan in 2005.
Antonio Larazo (1968-1988) Scrapped as Logos Ii at Aliaga, Turkey in 2008.
Vicente Puchol (1969-1987) As 7107 Islands Cruise since 2009.
Isla De Menorca (1971-1984) Scrapped at Aliaga, Turkey in 2004.
J.J Sister (1975-1994) Scrapped at Aliaga, Turkey in 2005.
Manuel Solo (1976-1992) Scrapped at Aliaga, Turkey in 2013.
Ciudad De La Laguna (1975-1999) Scrapped in 2008.
Villa De Agaete (1975-2002) Scrapped at Alang India in 2008.
Canguro Bruno (1978-1982) Scrapped at Aliaga, Turkey in 2001.
Ciudad De Ceuta (1978-2001) Scrapped in 2001.
Ciudad De Zaragoza (1978-1999) Scrapped at Cadiz, Spain in 2000.
Ciudad De Badajoz (1979-2004) Scrapped as Nena at Alang, India in 2008.
Ciudad De Sevilla (1980-2009) Scrapped as Sevilla in 2010.
Ciudad De Santa Cruz De La Palma (1981-1998) Scrapped as Oriental Princess at Indonesia in 2014.
Ciudad De Palma (1981-1982) Scrapped as Samundhar Sikharam at Aliaga, Turkey in 2009.
Ciudad De Salamanca (1982-2007) Scrapped at Aliaga, Turkey in 2013.
Ciudad De Valencia (1984-2009) Scrapped as Mary The Queen at Manila, Philippines in 2016.
Bahia De Cadiz (1984-1985) Scrapped at Aliaga, Turkey in 2012.
Scirocco (1987-1992) Scrapped at Alang, India in 2009.
Marrajo (1989-2000) As Fiammeta M for Ustica Lines in 2000.
Ciudad De Burgos (1990-2007) Sank near Istanbul, Turkey in 2004 one person on board died and 20 are missing.
Cala Salada (1990-2000) As Mira since 2019.
Cala Fustan (1990-2000) As Amazon since 2014.
Princess Dacil (1990-2006) As Rocket 3 for a japanese company since 2006.
Santa De Cruz De Tenerife (1993-2012) as Seira for an Indonesian company since 2017.
Alcantara (1995-2012) as Royal Star since 2012.
Almundaina (1996-2008) as San Valentin since 2008.
Ciudad De Tanger (1998-2002) as Zadar for Jadrolinjia since 2004.
Super-Fast Andalucia (1999-2015) Scrapped as Eurocargo Trieste at Aliaga, Turkey in 2020.
Super-Fast Canarias (1999-2015) Scrapped as Eurpcargo Patrasso at Aliaga, Turkey in 2021.
Millenium (2000-2010) as Volcan De Teno for Naviera Armas since 2016.
Alyssa (2000-2001) as Optima Seaways for DFDS since 2012.
Murillo (2002-2014) as Cracovia for Polferries since 2017.
Almudaina Dos (2005-2022) as Santa Irini for a Greek company since 2022.
Zurbaran (2006-2019) as Isle Of Inisheer for Irish Ferries since 2019.
El Greco (2006-2007) as Finbo Cargo for Eckero Line since 2019.
Giulia D'Abundo (2007-2010) Scrapped as Abundo at Alang, India in 2010.
Vronskiy (2008-2021) Scrapped as Damla at Aliaga, Turkey in 2021.
Aegean Heaven (2008-2010) as Ayshe since 2014.
Albayzin (2010-2019) as Venezia for Grimaldi Lines since 2019.
Tenacia (2011-2022) as Tenacia for Grandi Navi Veloci since 2022.
Audacia (2008-2011) as Rizhao Orient for a chinese company since 2014.
Sherbatiskiy (2013-2015) Scrapped as Sher at Alang, India in 2015.
Sorrento (2014-2015) A fire broke out when departure from Palma De Mallorca in 24th April 2015. The passengers survived. In 2016 the ship scrapped at Aliaga, Turkey.
Snav Adriatico (2015-2017) as Snav Adriatico for Grandi Navi Veloci since 2017.
Forza (2016-2022) as Forza for Grandi Navi Veloci since 2022.
Dimonios (2017-2021) as Ciudad De Palma for Grimaldi Euromed since 2021.
Nura Nova (2017-2019) as Lady Carmela for Gestour since 2019.
Villa De Teror (2019-2020) as Madeleine II for C.T.M.A. since 2020.

References

External links

 Trasmediterránea official website
 Acciona corporate website

Ferry companies of Spain
Companies based in the Community of Madrid
Transport in Catalonia
Transport in Tenerife
Transport in Gran Canaria